The 2015–16 BBL season was the 29th campaign of the British Basketball League since the league's establishment in 1987. The season featured 12 teams from across England and Scotland.

Teams

Championship

Regular season

Standings

Playoffs

Bracket

Quarter-finals
(1) Leicester Riders vs. (8) Leeds Force

(2) Newcastle Eagles vs. (7) Cheshire Phoenix

(3) Sheffield Sharks vs. (6) London Lions

(4) Worcester Wolves vs. (5) Glasgow Rocks

Semi-finals
(1) Leicester Riders vs. (7) Cheshire Phoenix

(3) Sheffield Sharks vs. (5) Glasgow Rocks

Final

BBL Cup

1st Round

Quarter-finals

Semi-finals

Final

BBL Trophy

1st Round

Quarter-finals

Semi-finals

Final

References

British Basketball League seasons
1
British